Theriodes sandakanensis is a species of loach found only in northern Borneo.  This species grows to a length of  TL.  This species is the only known member of its genus.

References

Cobitidae
Monotypic fish genera
Fish described in 1962